Huffington is a surname. Notable people with the surname include:

Anita Huffington (born 1934), American sculptor
Arianna Huffington (born 1950), Greek-American author and columnist
Michael Huffington (born 1947), American politician
Roy M. Huffington (1917–2008), American oilman and former U.S Ambassador to Austria

Fictional characters
Chumley Huffington, a character in the Yu-Gi-Oh! GX anime series

See also
The Huffington Post, a liberal weblog
Uffington (disambiguation)